Aleksandre Geladze (born 19 November 1972) is a retired Georgian professional football player.

External links
Profile at FootballFacts.ru

1972 births
Living people
Footballers from Georgia (country)
Expatriate footballers from Georgia (country)
Expatriate footballers in Russia
Expatriate footballers in Germany
FC Zhemchuzhina Sochi players
Russian Premier League players
Eintracht Braunschweig players
FC Dinamo Tbilisi players
FC Guria Lanchkhuti players
FC SKA Rostov-on-Don players
Association football midfielders